Dubway Studios is an audio post and music production facility located in the Financial District of Manhattan, New York City. Services offered at Dubway Studios include tracking, recording, mixing, mastering, music production, voice-over sessions, and remote connections via Source Connect, phone patch, and Skype.

Dubway's clients have included: HBO, Discovery Channel, Nick Jr. and Nickelodeon, PBS, Showtime, McDonald's, iTunes, IFC, NFL Films, Twentieth Century Fox, NPR, The New York Times, Antony & the Johnsons, Devendra Banhart, Patti Smith, They Might Be Giants, David Byrne, Cyndi Lauper, Dar Williams, Alicia Keys, Joseph Arthur, Dan Bern, Richard Barone, and Cat Power.

History 
Dubway Studios was founded in 1981 by Al Houghton in the historic Music Building in Midtown. The building was known to house a community of musicians and artists and was featured in The New York Times. It was here that Al Houghton recorded They Might Be Giants' eponymous debut album, and Lincoln, their second album.

After 16 years Houghton and his team made the decision to move Dubway Studios to Chelsea, where Mike Crehore joined him as a partner. The studio remained here for 14 years until relocating once more. During this time Dubway expanded into television production, providing the audio for Nickelodeon's award-winning animated children's series, The Backyardigans, Winx Club, and Bubble Guppies. Dubway's current residence is in Manhattan's Financial District at 42 Broadway New York, NY, located on the 22nd floor of the historic building built in 1902 and designed by Henry Ives Cobb. Dubway Studios shares part of the complex with Engine Room Audio.

Al Houghton partnered with Michael Rubin to form Rhumba Recorders, a full-service music and audio production company that provides original songs and scores, musical direction, music and voice recording, sound design, and audio post-production for children's media. Houghton was the Sound Production Supervisor for Nick Jr.'s Emmy-nominated series, Wallykazam!. Dubway continues to record music, film and television audio, podcasts and audio books.

In 2019, Dubway opened Dubway West, a partner studio in Los Angeles.  The West Coast branch is led by engineer Chris Montgomery and has worked on recordings by artists including Vampire Weekend, The Roots, Adele, Beck, The Killers, Bishop Briggs, and Macklemore.

Recording Studios

Main floor 
The main floor of the complex is centered around three smaller control rooms accompanied by two isolation booths and a larger triangular grand piano room. The three sound rooms are fit to record voice-overs, vocals, guitar, bass, piano and many other smaller instruments.

Mezzanine studio 
The penthouse Mezzanine studio features an 1100 sq. ft. recording space featuring 20 ft. ceilings, two large isolation booths, a vocal booth, and an SSL 4064 G+ console. Dubway shares the mezzanine with Engine Room Audio, who converted the original rooftop executive squash court into the current studio.

References 

Recording studios in Manhattan